The Donald J. Trump Presidential Library is the presidential library of Donald Trump, 45th president of the United States, a website administered by the National Archives and Records Administration (NARA) and launched on January 20, 2021, when Trump officially left office. It is the 15th NARA-managed presidential library. Plans to build a library and museum are expected but yet to be announced.

Official records
No NARA temporary location has been identified to store Trump's Presidential records until he builds his own Presidential Library. Currently, the NARA is storing Trump's Presidential records at current NARA government locations.  

The NARA library is established by the Presidential Records Act and is independent of possible plans for a physical building under the Presidential Libraries Act. All current content has been previously available to the public, including websites such as Melania Trump's Be Best, photographs, and social media accounts including @POTUS and @FLOTUS. Other private records will be subject to access requests under the Freedom of Information Act from January 2026.

While most records will be open to FOIA requests by 2026, records could be withheld from public access on the basis of executive privilege for up to twelve years.

On the day before leaving office, President Trump designated Mark Meadows, Pat Cipollone, John Eisenberg, Patrick Philbin, Scott Gast, Michael Purpura, and Steven Engel as his presidential records representatives to potentially act on his behalf should he be incapacitated and unable to exercise executive privilege with respect to access to his administration's records.

Building plans
As with other presidential libraries, a building for Trump would need to be privately financed and organized before the possible involvement of the NARA. During Trump's presidency, it had been speculated that floors in Trump Tower may be dedicated for use as a future presidential library. The Washington Post reported in the final week of his presidency that two sources close to Trump said he plans to build a library and museum in Florida run by Dan Scavino, funded by raising $2 billion from grassroots supporters.

References

External links
 

Trump
Library
Library
2021 establishments in the United States
Internet properties established in 2021